The badminton men's team tournament at the 2017 Southeast Asian Games in Kuala Lumpur was held from 22 to 24 August at the Axiata Arena, Kuala Lumpur, Malaysia.

Schedule
All times are Malaysia Standard Time (UTC+08:00)

Results

Quarter-final

Semi-final

Final

See also
Women's team tournament
Individual event

References

Men's team